"Modern Woman" is a song performed by Billy Joel from his album The Bridge. It was the album's lead-off single and was featured on the soundtrack to the film Ruthless People. In the film the song removes an instrumental break present in the original. It was a #10 pop hit on Billboard's Hot 100 Charts in 1986.

Reception
Cash Box called it "a chugging, instantly appealing cut". Billboard said: "phrases turn with top hat-and-tails flair, rhythm track barrels along like the last of the steam powered trains".

Personnel
 Billy Joel – lead and backing vocals, synthesizers
 David Brown – guitar
 Russell Javors – guitar
 Liberty DeVitto – drums
 Doug Stegmeyer – bass guitar
 Mark Rivera – tenor saxophone

Additional personnel
 Rob Mounsey – orchestration
 Jimmy Bralower – percussion

Charts

References

1986 singles
Billy Joel songs
Songs written by Billy Joel
Song recordings produced by Phil Ramone
Columbia Records singles
1986 songs